Events in the year 2018 in Kenya.

Incumbents
President: Uhuru Kenyatta
Deputy President: William Ruto
Chief Justice: David Maraga

Events
March–June - 2018 East Africa floods 
9 March – 2018 Kenya handshake
19 March – Sudan, last known male northern white rhinoceros, died in Kenya.
26 March – A giant crack in the ground, measuring 50 feet deep and 65 feet across, opens in or near Nairobi. 
9 May – The Patel Dam near the township of Solai, Nakuru County, in the Rift Valley burst amid heavy rains, killing at least 45 people.
28 June - Gikomba fire
10 October - At least 51 people are killed when a bus traveling from the Kenyan capital Nairobi to Kisumu veers off the road and overturns.

Sports
9 to 25 February – Kenya participated at the 2018 Winter Olympics in PyeongChang, South Korea

Deaths

1 March – Louis Onguto, judge, member of the High Court.
3 September – Paul Koech, long distance runner, half marathon world champion (b. 1969).
3 October – Joseph Kamaru, benga musician and political activist (b. 1939).

References

 
Kenya
Kenya
2010s in Kenya
Years of the 21st century in Kenya